The Punjab Government built Anglo-Sikh war memorial at Ferozeshah, Ferozepur at Moga Road. The memorial was built to honor the soldiers who died fighting against British army at Chillianwala on 13 January 1849; Sabhraon on 10 February 1846; Mudki on 18 December 1845; and  Ferozeshah on 21–22 December 1845.

Architect 
H S Chopra, the senior Architect of Punjab Agricultural University, Ludhiana designed the three-storeyed Memorial near Sirhind feeder and on the banks of Rajasthan Canal of Ferozepur.  HS Chopra was guided by Dr. MS Randhawa, who was then the Vice Chancellor of the Ferozeshah memorial Committee Made by Punjab Government.

LANDSCAPE design of the memorial was done by S Hari Singh Sandhu the then XEN Horticulture Punjab Agriculture University.

Memorial 
The Memorial is in a plot of 2 hectares where one of the Anglo-Sikh war happened. The Ground floor of the memorial is 2 meters above the surrounding area. The monument has collections of murals, portraits and paintings depicting battlefield made by renowned painters Jaswant Singh and Kirpal Singh. The bronze carved quotes on Cunningham's history; the wars of Shah Mohammad; the Anglo-Sikh war weapons donated by the Punjab government from the Patiyala Museum, is displayed in the Memorial.

References

External links 
ferozepur.nic.in
punjabtourism. org

Monuments and memorials in Punjab, India
Museums in Punjab, India
Anglo-Sikh wars